of the Kōnan Railway Company and  of East Japan Railway Company (JR East) on the northern Ōu Main Line form an integrated railway station in the town of Ōwani, Minamitsugaru District, Aomori Prefecture, Japan.

Lines
Kōnan Railway's Ōwani Station is the southern terminus of the Kōnan Railway Ōwani Line.

Station layout
JR Ōwani-Onsen Station has one island platform and one side platform serving tracks 1 to 3. The Kōnan Railway Ōwani Station has one island platform serving tracks 4 and 5; however, in practice only track 4 is in use.

Platforms

History
A footbridge connecting the platforms was completed in 1915, and the station building in 1921.

With the privatization of JNR on April 1, 1987, it came under the operational control of JR East. On March 16, 1991, it was renamed Ōwani-Onsen Station.

The Kōnan Railway Ōwani Station opened on January 26, 1952. On October 1, 1970 it was renamed  to distinguish it from the adjacent JNR station; however, it reverted to its original name on April 1, 1986.

Passenger statistics
In fiscal 2016, the JR East station was used by an average of 212 passengers daily (boarding passengers only).

Surrounding area
 Aomori Bank Ōwani branch
 Ōwani Post Office 
 Ōwani Onsen

See also
 List of railway stations in Japan

References

External links

 
Konan Railway website 

Railway stations in Japan opened in 1895
Railway stations in Japan opened in 1952
Railway stations in Aomori Prefecture
Konan Railway
Ōu Main Line
Ōwani, Aomori